Thomas Coffin Doane (1814-1896) was a Canadian photographer. His work is held in the collections of the New York Public Library, the Royal BC Museum, the McCord Museum, the Library and Archives of Canada, among others.

Early life 
Doane was born in 1814 in Barrington, Nova Scotia, Canada.

Work 
In 1832 Doane began working as a portrait painter. In 1842 he went to Halifax, Canada to learn the daguerreotype process from William Valentine. In 1843, Doane and Valentine travelled to set up a daguerrotype photography business at the Golden Inn at St. Johns in Newfoundland under the name of Valentine & Doane. By 1846, he had established a clientele including subjects such as Jeffrey Howe, John Sartain, and Lord Elgin, Louis Joseph Papineau, among others. In 1865 he was no longer making photographs.

Following his practice with Valentine, Doane travelled to the West Indies before setting up a studio in Montreal.

Personal life 
In 1866 Doane moved to New York. He and his wife had a daughter, Kathleen Maud Doane, who married the American artist Childe Hassam.

Gallery

References 

19th-century Canadian photographers
1814 births
1896 deaths
Canadian portrait painters
19th-century Canadian painters
Canadian male painters
19th-century Canadian male artists